The , later reclassified , was a DC electric multiple unit (EMU) train type operated by the private railway operator Keikyu on limited-stop commuter services in the Tokyo area of Japan from 1956 until 1986.

Interior
Passenger accommodation consisted of facing four-person seating bays, with longitudinal bench seats near the doorways.

History
The 700 series trains were first introduced in 1956, broadly based on the earlier 500 series trains.

From April 1966, the trains were reclassified "600 series", and roughly half of the former driving cars were rebuilt as intermediate cars with the cabs removed. At the same time, the headlamps were changed from the original incandescent light bulbs to sealed beam headlamps, and the original steel doors were replaced with new stainless steel doors.

Withdrawals of the 600 series trains commenced in 1984 with the introduction of 2000 series trains, and the last members of the fleet were withdrawn in March 1986 following a Sayonara (farewell) run.

Resale

Six former 600 series cars were resold to the Takamatsu-Kotohira Electric Railroad ("Kotoden") in Shikoku, where they became the 1070 series, modified with front-end gangways and longitudinal seating.

The identities and histories of the six 600 series cars sold to Kotoden are as shown below.

Preservation
Car DeHa 601 is preserved in the No. 1 Recreation Park in Zushi, Kanagawa.

References

Further reading

 
 

Electric multiple units of Japan
700 series
Kawasaki multiple units
Tokyu Car multiple units
Train-related introductions in 1956
1500 V DC multiple units of Japan